Ralimetinib (LY2228820) is a small molecule experimental cancer drug in development by Eli Lilly. It is a p38 mitogen-activated protein kinase inhibitor.

A phase II trial for treatment of ovarian cancer has completed.

References 

Experimental cancer drugs
Fluoroarenes
Imidazoles
Protein kinase inhibitors
Tert-butyl compounds
Clinical trials sponsored by Eli Lilly and Company